Nolle or Nölle may refer to:

Nolle prosequi, legal Latin term for the discontinuance of a prosecution
Marianne Nölle (born 1938), German serial killer
Thomas Nölle (1948–2020), German artist
Richard Nolle, American astrologer, coiner of the term "supermoon"
Nollendorfplatz, colloquially called Nolle, a square in Berlin, Germany
Nolle, a district of Dissen, Lower Saxony, Germany

See also 
Nolly (disambiguation)